Zubchenko is a Ukrainian surname. Notable people with the surname include:

 Halyna Zubchenko (1929–2000), Ukrainian painter
 Vita Zubchenko (born 1989), Ukrainian rhythmic gymnast

See also
 

Ukrainian-language surnames